Baleru is a village in Bhamini mandal, located in Srikakulam district of the Indian state of Andhra Pradesh. It is located between The River Vamsadhara and Tivva hills.

References 

Villages in Srikakulam district